A Night at Birdland Vol. 3 may refer to two different jazz albums, both of which contain live material recorded by the Art Blakey Quintet at Birdland on February 21, 1954.
The first is the third album in the original 10" series (BLP 5039) released in 1954 by Blue Note Records. The three original 10" albums were repackaged as two 12" LPs in 1956, with all of the tracks from the original 10" Vol. 3 being included on the 12" Vol. 2.

The second album entitled A Night at Birdland Vol. 3 is a 12" album containing outtakes from the original session, released by the Toshiba Records in Japan, released in 1984. Three of the four tracks on the Japanese 12" Vol. 3 had previously been released as part of a 2 LP Compilation entitled Live Messengers (BN-LA473-J2) in 1975.

All of the tracks from both Vol. 3's have subsequently been reissued on the CD versions of A Night at Birdland Vol. 1 and A Night at Birdland Vol. 2.

Track listing

10" LP

12" LP

Personnel
 Art Blakey, drums
 Clifford Brown, trumpet
 Lou Donaldson, alto saxophone
 Horace Silver, piano
 Curly Russell, bass

References

Art Blakey live albums
1954 live albums
Blue Note Records live albums